Charles Birks & Co Ltd. was a South Australian department store founded by Charles Napier Birks in Rundle Street, Adelaide. His son Napier Birks took over the business in 1908. The business was acquired by David Jones Limited in 1954.

History
Charles Napier Birks (13 February 1844 – 29 April 1924) was born in Knutsford, near Manchester, England, and emigrated with his parents Hannah Napier Birks (6 May 1807 – 13 August 1883) and Dr. George Vause Birks (c. 1815 – 31 January 1858) and family on the Leonidas, arriving at Glenelg, South Australia in December 1853. They settled in Angaston, where his father began practising. He died four years later, as a result of being thrown from his horse. Mrs Birks then ran a store in Angaston, assisted by her sons William and George, who as W. H & G. N. Birks later opened a stationery shop and Birks Chemists in Rundle Street.
 
Charles Birks & Co.
David Robin (c. 1835 – 24 February 1914) and Charles Birks, as Robin & Birks, took over the "London House" drapery shop at 89 Hindley Street from George Shaw (c. 1815 – 1895) in October 1864. Their next takeover was J. Ballantyne & Co.'s store at 38 Rundle Street in October 1871. The partnership was dissolved on 24 January 1876, when Robin took over the Hindley Street (At that time the major shopping strip and the more prestigious location) store, which in 1882/83 he sold to Joseph Henry Pellew (1854–1904).

Charles took the Rundle Street property, which he rebranded Charles Birks', and, assisted by Harry Ingham ( –1883), spared no expense in establishing the store at the upper end of the market. In 1879 he took his brother Walter Richard Birks (1847–1900) and William Honeywill (c. 1853–1929) into partnership, in 1881 rebranding the business as Charles Birks & Co.; Henry Joseph Bailey and George Mowat were later admitted.
Charles Birks retired from active involvement in 1884; Bailey and Mowat retired in 1886, and George bought out Walter's share shortly after. 
In 1888 a major building expansion was undertaken, at a cost of £25,000, perhaps $3M in today's values. In 1893 Charles's son Napier Kyffin Birks (1876–1953) was taken on as an office boy, then in 1900 was made a partner, then sole proprietor when Charles relinquished his share in 1908.

In 1913 Napier Birks purchased the whole of the Rundle Street frontage from Stephens Place to Gawler Place, and rebuilt the store. He appointed Frank Edward Cornish (1863–1930), who had been with the firm since age 12, as general manager, and when he enlisted in the Great War in July 1915 put Cornish in charge.
The firm was restructured as a limited liability company in late 1920, with Cornish appointed a director. Two new partners who bought into the company were Edmund Arnold Farr (died 1957) and William Gilbert Hayes (died 1926).

The business was acquired by David Jones Limited in 1954.

Gallery

Family
For details on the extended family see George Vause Birks.

Charles Napier Birks (13 February 1844 – 29 April 1924), generally known as Charles Birks (without middle name), married Mary Maria Thomas (c. 1843 – 18 March 1878) on 13 September 1866; they had six children. He married again, to Rosetta Jane "Rose" Thomas (12 March 1856 – 3 October 1911) on 8 March 1879. Mary and Rose were first and fifth daughters of William Kyffin Thomas. He married once more, to Alice May Hone (1878–1953), a sister of Dr. F. S. Hone, on 11 September 1913, lived "Felton", Lefevre Terrace, North Adelaide, then from 1914 at "Avonlea", 26 Northcote Tce., Gilberton. She married again, to George E. Goodhart, on 20 December 1926.
Mary Frances Birks (26 September 1867 – 1 June 1916)
Helen  Napier "Nellie" Birks (20 June 1869 – 27 January 1949) married Charles Hedley Phillipps "Hedley" Fisher (c. 1860 – 25 November 1938), son of Daniel Fisher MP on 14 February 1898
Margaret Beatrice Fisher (1898–1987) married John Neetlee "Jack" Bagot (17 December 1898 – 1977) on 11 June 1932. Jack was a grandson of Edward Meade Bagot.
Sybil Helen Fisher (1903–1995) married Frederick Winsloe Hall (14 May 1899 – 1953) on 10 June 1933
Edith Vause Birks (9 May 1871 – 1959) married Dr. Charles Henry Reissmann ( – ) on 31 July 1900; they changed their names to Riceman, lived at Mt. Lofty.
Nora Frances Reissmann/Riceman (20 April 1902 – ) married Ronald Nicholas Lamond Hopkins (1897–1990) in 1926. He was SA's highest military officer. 
Sidney Mary Reissmann (2 September 1905 – ) left for England to pursue her pianoforte and Dalcroze eurhythmics interests.
Barbara Meredith Reissmann/Riceman (4 May 1907 – 1996) married Edward Lauriston Phillips (1892–1971) in 1936
David Stirling Reissmann/Riceman (30 September 1910 – 2001) married Nancy Helen Magarey (1915–2005), a great-granddaughter of Thomas Magarey.  He was a scientist with Waite Research, CSIR, pioneer of soil trace elements, president of Legacy (SA).
Catherine Louise Birks (Katherine?)  (14 April 1873 – 1930) married Norman McDougall ( – ) in Beddgelert, Wales, on 12 September 1900

Margaret Eason Birks (6 February 1875 – 12 November 1950) married Walter Fowler-Brownsworth ( – ) on 23 August 1913
Napier Kyffin Birks (21 January 1876 – 22 August 1953) married Lucy McDougall ( – 26 January 1951) on 11 September 1899, lived The Parade, Norwood, then 3 Springfield Ave., Springfield
Edith Napier Birks (9 June 1900 – c. 1975) was an artist, arts administrator and speedboat racer.

Leslie Napier Birks (30 December 1904 – 14 July 1929) killed in light aircraft crash
Norman Napier Birks (6 September 1906 – 17 February 1949) married Patricia Baines Bruce (1912– ) on 28 June 1932. He was managing director of Motors Ltd., Adelaide, and original 1925 member Cambridge University Air Squadron.

References

External links
Birks Chemists history

Defunct department stores of Australia
History of Adelaide
Companies based in Adelaide
Companies established in 1864
Australian companies established in 1864
Retail companies established in 1864
Companies disestablished in 1954